There are many places in South Africa named after people.

Western Cape
 Albertinia – Johannes Rudolph Albertyn
 Athlone – Alexander Cambridge, 1st Earl of Athlone
 Beaufort West – Henry Somerset, 5th Duke of Beaufort
 Bellville – Charles Davidson Bell
 Bredasdorp – Michiel van Breda, later first Mayor of Cape Town
 Caledon – 2nd Earl of Caledon
 Calitzdorp – Calitz family
 Camps Bay (Cape Town) – Friedrich von Kamptz
 Clanwilliam – 1st Earl of Clanwilliam
 Darling – Charles Henry Darling, lieutenant-governor of Cape Colony
 Durbanville – Sir Benjamin d'Urban
 George – King George III of the United Kingdom
 Gordon's Bay – Robert Jacob Gordon
 Hermanus – Hermanus Pieters
 Hopefield – Col William Hope and William Field
 Ladismith – Lady Smith, wife of Sir Harry Smith
 Laingsburg – John Laing
 Lamberts Bay – Admiral Sir Robert Lambert
 Maitland, Cape Town – Sir Peregrine Maitland, governor of Cape Colony
 Malmesbury – 1st Earl of Malmesbury
 McGregor – Rev Andrew McGregor
 Milnerton – Sir Alfred Milner
 Montagu – John Montagu
 Moorreesburg – Rev Johannes Moorrees
 Murraysburg – Reverend Andrew Murray Snr
 Napier – Sir George Napier, governor of Cape Colony
 Oudtshoorn – Baron Pieter van Reede van Oudtshoorn, governor of Cape Colony
 Parow – Johann Heinrich Parow
 Plettenberg Bay – Baron Joachim Ammema van Plettenberg, governor of Cape Colony
 Porterville – William Porter, attorney-general of Cape Colony
 Prince Albert – Prince Albert
 Prince Alfred Hamlet – The Prince Alfred, second son of Queen Victoria
 Riebeeck Kasteel – Jan van Riebeeck
 Riebeeck West – Jan van Riebeeck
 Riversdale – Harry Rivers
 Robertson – Rev Dr William Robertson
 Saldanha – Antonio de Saldanha
 Simon's Town – Simon van der Stel
 Somerset West – Lord Charles Henry Somerset, governor of Cape Colony
 Stellenbosch – Simon van der Stel, governor of Cape Colony
 Swellendam – Hendrik Swellengrebel and his wife Helena Ten Damme
 Tulbagh – Ryk Tulbagh, governor of Cape Colony
 Vanrhynsdorp – Petrus Benjamin van Rhyn
 Wellington – Duke of Wellington
 Wolseley – Viscount Wolseley
 Worcester – Marquess of Worcester

Eastern Cape
 Adelaide – Adelaide of Saxe-Meiningen
 Alexandria, Eastern Cape – Rev Alexander Smit
 Alfred Nzo District Municipality – Alfred Baphethuxolo Nzo
 Alice – Princess Alice, second daughter of Queen Victoria
 Aliwal North – Sir Harry Smith, 1st Baronet of Aliwal
 Balfour, Eastern Cape – Robert Balfour, secretary of the Glasgow Missionary Society
 Barkly East – Sir Henry Barkly
 Bedford – Duke of Bedford
 Butterworth – Joseph Butterworth
 Chris Hani District Municipality – Chris Hani
 Cradock – John Cradock, 1st Baron Howden
 Dias Division – Bartolommeo Dias
 Elliot – Henry George Elliot
 Fort Beaufort – Henry Somerset, 5th Duke of Beaufort
 Graaff-Reinet – Cornelis van der Graaff and his wife Hester Reynet
 Grahamstown – John Graham
 Humansdorp – Johannes Jurie Human and Matthys Gerhardus Human
 Jansenville – Jan Willem Janssens
 Joe Gqabi District Municipality – Joe Nzingo Gqabi (1929–1981)
 Joubertina – Rev W.A. Joubert
 King William's Town – King William IV of the United Kingdom
 Kirkwood – James Somers Kirkwood
 Lady Grey – Lady Eliza Lucy Grey
 Maclear – Thomas Maclear
 Nelson Mandela Bay Metropolitan Municipality – Nelson Mandela
 OR Tambo District Municipality – Oliver Tambo
 Philipstown – Sir Philip Wodehouse, governor of Cape Colony
 Port Alfred – The Prince Alfred, second son of Queen Victoria
 Port Elizabeth – Elizabeth Donkin (wife of acting governor Sir Rufane Shaw Donkin)
 Queenstown – Queen Victoria
 Richmond, Eastern Cape – Duke of Richmond
 Sarah Baartman District Municipality – Sarah Baartman (1789–1815)
 Seymour – Colonel Seymour
 Somerset East – Lord Charles Henry Somerset, governor of Cape Colony
 Steynsburg – Andries Steyn
 Steytlerville – Abraham Isaac Steytler
 Stutterheim – Baron von Stutterheim
 Uitenhage – Jacob Uitenhage de Mist

Northern Cape
 Barkly West – Sir Henry Barkly
 Calvinia – John Calvin, from its church dedicated to him
 Carnarvon – Henry Herbert, 4th Earl of Carnarvon
 Cathcart – Sir George Cathcart
 Colesberg – Sir Galbraith Lowry Cole
 Douglas – Lieutenant-General Sir Percy Douglas
 Frances Baard District Municipality – Frances Baard
 Jankempdorp – Gen Jan Kemp
 John Taolo Gaetsewe District Municipality – John Taolo Gaetsewe
 Kimberley – John Wodehouse, 1st Earl of Kimberley
 Loxton – A.E. Loxton
 Molteno – John Charles Molteno, first prime minister of Cape Colony
 Port Nolloth – Captain M. S. Nolloth
 Pixley ka Seme District Municipality – Dr. Pixley ka Isaka Seme, one of the founders of African National Congress
 Reivilo – Rev A.J. Olivier
 Sutherland – Henry Sutherland, pastor who established the church around which the settlement grew
 Upington – Thomas Upington
 Victoria West – Queen Victoria
 Warrenton – Sir Charles Warren
 Williston – Colonel Willis
 ZF Mgcawu District Municipality – Z. F. Mgcawu, Upington's first post-1994 democratically elected mayor

Free State
 Allanridge – Allan Roberts
 Brandfort – Johannes Brand, state president of the Orange Free State
 Cornelia – Cornelia Mulder, wife of Francis William Reitz, president of the Orange Free State
 Dealesville – John Henry Deale
 Deneysville – Deneys Reitz
 Dewetsdorp – Jacobus de Wet, father of General Christiaan de Wet
 Fauresmith – Reverend Phillip Faure and Sir Harry Smith, 1st Baronet
 Fezile Dabi District Municipality – Fezile Abram Dabi (1956–1997)
 Harrismith – Sir Harry Smith, 1st Baronet
 Hennenman – P.F. Hennenman
 Hertzogville – James Barry Munnik Hertzog
 Hobhouse – Emily Hobhouse
 Kestell – Rev Dr J.D. Kestell
 Lindley – Rev Daniel Lindley
 Paul Roux – Dr Paul Roux
 Philippolis – Rev Dr John Philip
 Rouxville – Rev Pieter Roux
 Thabo Mofutsanyana District Municipality – Thabo Edwin Mofutsanyana (1899–1995)
 Viljoenskroon – Hans Viljoen and his horse 'Kroon'
 Villiers – Lourens de Villiers
 Warden – Charles Warden, administrator of the Orange River Sovereignty
 Zastron – Johanns sibella Zastron, wife of president Johannes Brand

Gauteng
 Alexandra – Alexandra Papenfus (wife of farmer)
 Benoni – the original name of the Biblical Benjamin
 Boksburg – W.E. Bok, state secretary of the South African Republic
 Carletonville – Guy Carleton Jones
 Johannesburg – Johannes Rissik; Johannes Meyer
 Krugersdorp – Paul Kruger
 Pretoria – Andries Pretorius
 Sharpeville – John Sharpe
 Vanderbijlpark – Hendrik van der Bijl

KwaZulu-Natal
 Cato Ridge – George Christopher Cato, the first mayor of Durban 
 Colenso – Bishop John Colenso
 Durban – Sir Benjamin d'Urban
 Estcourt – Thomas Estcourt
 Greytown – George Edward Grey
 Harry Gwala District Municipality – Harry Gwala
 Hibberdene – C. Maxwell-Hibberd
 King Cetshwayo District Municipality – Cetshwayo kaMpande
 La Lucia – Lucia Michel
 Ladysmith – Lady Smith, wife of Sir Harry Smith
 Melmoth – Sir Melmoth Osborne, governor of Zululand
 Newcastle – Duke of Newcastle
 Pietermaritzburg – Two theories exist.
 In the theory officially accepted today by the city, it bears the name of Voortrekker leaders Piet Retief and Gert Maritz.
 In another theory, the city was originally named after Retief alone, initially "Pieter Mouriets Burg" (after his given names) and transformed to its current form.
 Pinetown – Sir Benjamin Pine, governor of Natal
 Port Edward – Edward VIII
 Port Shepstone – Theophilus Shepstone
 Richard's Bay – Frederick Richards
 Scottburgh – John Scott, lieutenant-governor of Natal
 Westville – Martin West, the first British lieutenant-governor of Natal

Limpopo
 Louis Trichardt – Louis Trichardt

Mpumalanga
 Balfour – Arthur James Balfour
 Barberton – Harry and Fred Barber, pioneer gold prospectors
 Breyten – Nicolaas Breytenbach
 Carolina – Carolina Coetzee, wife of the owner of the land on which the town was developed
 Evander – Evelyn Anderson
 Gert Sibande District Municipality – ANC activist Gert Sibande (1901–1987)
 Groblersdal – W.J. Grobler
 Machadodorp – General Jose Machado
 Nelspruit – Andries, Gert and Louis Nel
 Paulpietersburg – Paul Kruger and Petrus Jacobus Joubert
 Piet Retief – Piet Retief
 Standerton – A.J. Stander, owner of the farm on which the town was developed
 Trichardt – Carolus Johannes Trichardt, son of Louis Trichardt

North West
 Brits – Gert Brits, owner of the farm on which the town was developed
 Christiana – Christiana Pretorius, daughter of president Marthinus Wessel Pretorius
 Coligny – Admiral Gaspard II de Coligny
 Delareyville – General Jacobus de la Rey
 Dr Kenneth Kaunda District Municipality – Kenneth Kaunda, First President of Zambia
 Dr Ruth Segomotsi Mompati District Municipality – Ruth Mompati
 Klerksdorp – Jacob de Clerq
 Ngaka Modiri Molema District Municipality – Dr Silas Molema
 Potchefstroom – the first syllable comes from the surname of the town's founder Andries Hendrik Potgieter
 Schweizer Reneke – Captain Schweizer and Field Cornet Reneke
 Ventersdorp – Johannes Venter, owner of the farm on which the town was developed
 Wolmaransstad – J.M.A. Wolmarans
 Zeerust – Diederick Coetzee (the town was originally named 'Coetzee-Rust')

Former
 Ellisras (Limpopo) was the name of Lephalale – Patrick Ellis and Piet Erasmus (farm owners)
 Pietersburg (Limpopo) was the name of Polokwane – Petrus Jacobus Joubert
 Potgietersrus (Limpopo) was the name of Mokopane – Piet Potgieter
 Stanger (KwaZulu-Natal) was the name of KwaDukuza – William Stanger (Surveyor-General of Natal)
 Verwoerdburg (Gauteng) was the name of Centurion – Hendrik Verwoerd

References

South Africa
South Africa
Places